Sugar Grove is an unincorporated community located in Watauga County, North Carolina, United States. It is named after the sugar maples that grow in the area.  The community is located along US 321, west of Vilas and Boone, along the banks of Cove Creek.

History
Sugar Grove was founded in 1837, when John Mast opened the Sugar Grove Post Office; that year he reported a revenue of $14.  During the Civil War, Company E of the 37th Confederate Regiment was organized September, 1861. Between 1864 and 1865, the home guard battalion of Watauga was stationed at Camp Mast, nearby Sugar Grove. On February 5, 1865, Camp Mast surrendered, by majority vote, after being surrounded at dawn by a battalion of around 100 Union soldiers, led by Captain James Champion, of Indiana; those who voted for surrender were quickly paroled and discharged. In 1915, the first cheese factory in the area was established in Sugar Grove (unknown when closed).

The Cove Creek High School, Ben Farthing Farm, and Ward Family House are listed on the National Register of Historic Places.

See also
 Crossing Knob
 Watauga River

References

Unincorporated communities in Watauga County, North Carolina
Unincorporated communities in North Carolina
Populated places established in 1837
1837 establishments in North Carolina